Cytochrome c oxidase subunit 4 isoform 1, mitochondrial (COX4I1) is an enzyme that in humans is encoded by the COX4I1 gene. COX4I1 is a nuclear-encoded isoform of cytochrome c oxidase (COX) subunit 4. Cytochrome c oxidase (complex IV) is a multi-subunit enzyme complex that couples the transfer of electrons from cytochrome c to molecular oxygen and contributes to a proton electrochemical gradient across the inner mitochondrial membrane, acting as the terminal enzyme of the mitochondrial respiratory chain. Antibodies against COX4 can be used to identify the inner membrane of mitochondria in immunofluorescence studies. Mutations in COX4I1 have been associated with COX deficiency and Fanconi anemia.

Structure 
COX4I1 is located on the q arm of chromosome 16 in position 24.1 and has 6 exons. The COX4I1 gene produces a 9.3 kDa protein composed of 83 amino acids. COX4I1 is expressed ubiquitously. The protein encoded by COX4I1 belongs to the cytochrome c oxidase IV family. COX4I1 has a transit peptide domain and acetyl and phosphoprotein amino acid modifications. It is located at the 3' of the NOC4 (neighbor of COX4) gene in a head-to-head orientation, and shares a promoter with it.

Function 
COX4I1 encodes a protein that is located in the inner mitochondrial membrane and is an isoform of the nuclear-encoded subunit IV of cytochrome c oxidase (complex IV), the terminal oxidase in mitochondrial electron transport. Complex IV is a multi-subunit enzyme complex that couples the transfer of electrons from cytochrome c to molecular oxygen and contributes to a proton electrochemical gradient across the inner mitochondrial membrane. The expression of COX4I1, along with COX4I2, may be regulated by oxygen levels, with reduced levels of oxygen leading to increased COX4I2 expression and COX4I1 degradation. This suggests a role for COX4I1 in the optimization of the electron transfer chain under different conditions.

Clinical Significance 
Although relatively little is known about the function of COX4I1, mutations in this gene have been associated with mitochondrial complex IV diseases with severe phenotypes. Among these, COX deficiency and Fanconi anemia have been suspected and linked to mutations in the COX4I1 gene. Clinical features of pathogenic variants of COX4I1 can include short stature, poor weight gain, mild dysmorphic features, mental retardation, spastic paraplegia, severe epilepsy, a narrow and arched palate, malar hypoplasia, little subcutaneous fat, and arachnodactyly. The homozygous mutation K101N and a de novo 16q24.1 interstitial duplication have been found to cause defective COX4I1.

Interactions 
COX4I1 has 153 protein-protein interactions with 142 of them being co-complex interactions. COX4I1 has been found to interact with SDCBP, MT-CO1, IKBKE, TMBIM4, and MCL1.
 LON, a mitochondrial protease, has also been suggested to regulate the COX4 subunit isoforms by degrading COX4I1 under hypoxic conditions.

References

External links

Further reading